High Maynard Reservoir is located in Walthamstow in the London Borough of Waltham Forest. The storage reservoir is one of the Lee Valley Reservoir Chain and supplies drinking water to London.

History 
The reservoir was built in the mid-19th century by the East London Waterworks Company on former marshland and is now owned and managed by Thames Water.

Ecology 
The water is a Site of Special Scientific Interest (SSSI). In winter, cormorants roost on the island with their numbers reaching nationally important levels. The fringes of the reservoir contain many plant species that are uncommon to Greater London.

Recreation 
The water is open to the public and is popular with birdwatchers, walkers and anglers.

See also
 London water supply infrastructure

References 

Sites of Special Scientific Interest in London
Thames Water reservoirs
Reservoirs in London
Drinking water reservoirs in England